Lieutenant-Colonel John Hendley Morrison Kirkwood, DSO (1877–1924), was a British landowner and Conservative politician.

Career
Kirkwood was the eldest son and heir of Major James Morrison Kirkwood (1839–1907), of Yeo Vale, by his wife Isabel Brockman (died 1926). He inherited the Yeo Vale estate on his father's death in 1907, and also owned land in Ireland, including in County Mayo and County Sligo where (by March 1916) he sold 4,000 acres to the Congested Districts' Board.

He was commissioned a second-lieutenant in the 7th Dragoon Guards on 30 May 1900, was promoted to lieutenant and served in the Second Boer War before he resigned from the regular army. In October 1902 he was appointed a lieutenant in the Royal North Devon Hussars, a yeomanry regiment from his home county. He later re-enlisted for active service in World War I, and became a lieutenant-colonel.

He served as a Justice of the Peace for Devon

Kirkwood was elected a Member of Parliament for South East Essex in January 1910, was re-elected in December 1910, but resigned only two years later, in early 1912.

Family
Kirkwood married in 1902 Gertrude Lyle, eldest daughter of Sir Robert Park Lyle, 1st Baronet (1859–1923), of Greenock. They had several children, including Sir Robert Lucian Morrison Kirkwood, KCMG (1904–1984).

References

Sources
Burke's Genealogical and Heraldic History of the Landed Gentry, 15th Edition, ed. Pirie-Gordon, H., London, 1937, p. 1301, pedigree of Kirkham of Yeo Vale

External links
 

1877 births
1924 deaths
Conservative Party (UK) MPs for English constituencies
UK MPs 1910–1918
7th Dragoon Guards officers
People from Torridge District
Members of the Parliament of the United Kingdom for South East Essex